Standings and results for Group 6 of the UEFA Euro 1988 qualifying tournament.

Group 6 consisted of Czechoslovakia, Denmark, Finland and Wales. Group winners were Denmark, who finished one point clear of second-placed Czechoslovakia.

Final table

Results

Goalscorers

References
UEFA page
 RSSSF page

Group 6
1986 in Danish football
1987 in Danish football
1986–87 in Welsh football
1987–88 in Welsh football
1986–87 in Czechoslovak football
1987–88 in Czechoslovak football
1986 in Finnish football
1987 in Finnish football
Qual